Surprise Package is a 1960 American comedy film directed by Stanley Donen and starring Yul Brynner, Mitzi Gaynor, and Noël Coward. The supporting cast features George Coulouris, Michael Balfour, Eric Pohlmann and Barry Foster. The screenplay concerns an American gangster living on a Greek island and a deposed King who hatch a plan to steal some crown jewels.

Plot
Nico March is being deported by the U.S. government. Not wanting his money confiscated, he orders accomplice Johnny to hide it for now while also keeping an eye on Nico's longtime girlfriend, Gabby Rogers.

Exiled to an island, Nico quickly meets corrupt cop Mirales, who wants a bribe, and a banished king, Pavel, who wants to sell Nico his old crown. Nico is double-crossed by Johnny, who instead of sending him the money sends Gabby instead.

Nico figures out where the king's crown is hidden inside the old castle and plans to steal it, using Gabby to distract him. Other criminals, including Dr. Panzer and strongman Igor, want to get to it first. They steal it from Nico and knock him unconscious, but end up placed under arrest. Tibor, Nico's Hungarian spy friend, steals it back, and gets shot and dies in Gabby's arms, and Gabby gives it to Stavrin, who will place the crown in a monastery, for all the people of Anatolia to see. Nico proposes, and Gabby accepts, and they get married. Nico and the king both need money, so they turn the latter's castle into a casino, where Gabby "now" works as the hat & coat check girl.

Cast
 Yul Brynner as Nico March
 Mitzi Gaynor as Gabby Rogers
 Noël Coward as King Pavel II
 George Coulouris as Dr. Panzer
 Michael Balfour as Oscar
 Eric Pohlmann as Mirales
 Guy Deghy as Tibor
 Lyndon Brook as Stavrin
 Alf Dean as Igor Trofim (as Man Mountain Dean)
 Lionel Murton as US Marshal
 Barry Foster as US Marshal
 Michael Balfour as Oscar
 Cec Linder as Lawyer
 Bill Nagy as Johnny Stettina
 Frederick Leister  as Aide to King Pavel II
 Paul Carpenter as TV News Broadcaster 
 Danny Green as Nicky Canfield
 Carol White as Sexy Teenager

See also
 List of American films of 1960

References

External links 
 
 
 
 

1960 films
1960 comedy films
1960s heist films
American black-and-white films
American comedy films
American heist films
Films based on American novels
Films directed by Stanley Donen
Films set in Greece
Films set on islands
Films set in the Mediterranean Sea
Films with screenplays by Harry Kurnitz
Columbia Pictures films
American crime comedy films
1960s English-language films
1960s American films